William Ray Flores was a seaman apprentice in the United States Coast Guard. SA Flores was posthumously honored for heroic behavior during a 1980 ship collision. In November 2011, the Coast Guard selected Flores as the namesake of the third of its Sentinel class cutters.

Life
Flores was born and raised in Carlsbad, New Mexico. By the time he was in high school, he and his family moved to Benbrook, Texas. With his parents' permission, Flores left Western Hills High School in Benbrook early in order to serve in the United States Coast Guard.

Having been out of boot camp for only one year, Flores was stationed aboard USCGC Blackthorn. As Blackthorn left port from Tampa Bay, Florida on January 28, 1980, the 180-foot seagoing buoy tender collided with the tanker, SS Capricorn, as the tanker entered the bay. The 18-year-old Flores stayed aboard Blackthorn while it sank. He threw life jackets to seamen who were struggling in the water without life jackets. He strapped open the life jacket locker, so that the remaining life jackets were released and floated upwards to the men who were floundering in the water while the vessel sank. Flores then tried to aid wounded seamen who were still aboard. The collision has been described as the worst peacetime disaster in the Coast Guard's history. Seaman Apprentice Flores helped save twenty-three (23) of his crewmates, at the cost of his own life.

Honors
In 2000, twenty years after the collision, Flores was formally honored for his bravery. Flores was posthumously awarded the Coast Guard Medal. The Coast Guard Medal is the highest non-combat bravery award of the United States Coast Guard. 

In November 2011, the Coast Guard named its third Sentinel class cutter USCGC William Flores. All the vessels in this class are to be named after heroic members of the Coast Guard.

"Your Son is Gone," was the last of five Coast Guard marching cadences nominated for Coast Guard Boot Camp's Top Cadence of 2012. The cadence chronicles the last surviving minutes of Seaman Apprentice William R. Flores aboard Coast Guard Cutter Blackthorn January 28, 1980.

St. Petersburg, and the Coast Guard, each held commemorative events to mark the 40th anniversary of Flores' heroic act, in late January 2020.  A recently completed life size concrete statue of Flores was unveiled at the ceremony.  It will be placed offshore, near the site of the sinking.

In May 2021, Flores was awarded the Texas Legislative Medal of Honor for his actions on USCGC Blackthorn.

References

External links

1961 births
1980 deaths
United States Coast Guard enlisted
Recipients of the Coast Guard Medal
People from Carlsbad, New Mexico
Recipients of the Texas Legislative Medal of Honor